Heliconius numata, the Numata longwing,  is a  brush-footed butterfly species belonging to the family Nymphalidae, subfamily Heliconiinae.

Distribution and habitat
This species is native to most of South America, from Venezuela to southern Brazil (Guyana, French Guiana, Surinam, Guatemala, Venezuela, Ecuador, Bolivia, Brazil and Peru). H. numata is a neotropical species, less common in virgin forest than in areas of secondary growth.

Subspecies
Subspecies include:
Heliconius numata numata (Surinam, French Guiana, Guyana)
Heliconius numata silvana  (Stoll, 1781) (Surinam, Guyana, Venezuela, Guatemala, Brazil: Pará, Amazonas)
Heliconius numata ethra  (Hübner, [1831]) (Brazil: Espírito Santo)
Heliconius numata aristiona  Hewitson, [1853] (Bolivia, Peru)
Heliconius numata aurora  Bates, 1862 (Brazil: Amazonas, Colombia, Bolivia, Peru)
Heliconius numata euphone  C. & R. Felder, 1862 (Colombia, Ecuador)
Heliconius numata messene  C. & R. Felder, 1862 (Colombia)
Heliconius numata bicoloratus  Butler, 1873 (Peru)
Heliconius numata arcuella  Druce, 1874 (Peru)
Heliconius numata nubifer  Butler, 1875 (Brazil: Amazonas)
Heliconius numata superioris  Butler, 1875 (Brazil: Amazonas, Pará, Venezuela)
Heliconius numata robigus  Weymer, 1875 (Venezuela)
Heliconius numata aulicus  Weymer, 1883 (Venezuela)
Heliconius numata lenaeus  Weymer, 1891 (Ecuador)
Heliconius numata lyrcaeus  Weymer, 1891 (Peru)
Heliconius numata geminatus  Weymer, 1894 (Brazil: Amazonas)
Heliconius numata illustris  Weymer, 1894(Peru)
Heliconius numata mavors  Weymer, 1894 (Brazil: Amazonas)
Heliconius numata mirus  Weymer, 1894 (Bolivia)
Heliconius numata tarapotensis  Riffarth, 1901 (Peru)
Heliconius numata zobrysi  Fruhstorfer, 1910 (Brazil: Mato Grosso)
Heliconius numata ignotus  Joicey & Kaye, 1917 (Peru)
Heliconius numata talboti  Joicey & Kaye, 1917 (Peru)
Heliconius numata pratti  Joicey & Kaye, 1917 (Peru)
Heliconius numata peeblesi  Joicey & Talbot, 1925 (Venezuela)
Heliconius numata jiparanaensis Neustetter, 1931 (Brazil: Rondônia)
Heliconius numata holzingeri  Fernández & Brown, 1976 (Venezuela)
Heliconius numata sourensis  Brown, 1976 (Brazil: Pará)

Description
These  very large butterflies have long and rounded wings of brown and orange color, with very variable markings due to its capacity of mimicry with several species. The caterpillar is white with black spots and black thorns.

Biology
H. numata is known for its mimicry of Melinaea butterflies. Both H. numata and the species of Melinaea it resembles are unpalatable to predators, making this a case of Müllerian mimicry, a mutualistic reinforcement of the same negative signal.

Both males and females are attracted to red or orange flowers, or indeed to pieces of cloth colored red or orange. Eggs typically are found on low-growing vines of Passiflora. Caterpillars mainly feed on plants from the subgenera Granadilla, Astrophea and Distephana (Passifloraceae) and from the genera Tetrastyli  and Dilkea.

Gallery

Bibliography
Brown K. S. 1981 The Biology of Heliconius and Related Genera. Annual Review of Entomology 26, 427-456.
Cramer, Pieter [1721_1776] 1780. De uitlandische Kapellen voorkomende in de drie Waereld-Deelen Asia, Africa en America. Papillons exotiques des trois parties du monde l'Asie, l'Afrique et l'Amérique. Amsteldam, S. J. Baalde; Utrecht, Barthelemy Wild and J. Van Schoonho-ven & Comp.

References

numata
Nymphalidae of South America
Butterflies described in 1780